Rio Tinto Group is an Anglo-Australian multinational company that is the world's second-largest metals and mining corporation (behind BHP). The company was founded in 1873 when of a group of investors purchased a mine complex on the Rio Tinto, in Huelva, Spain, from the Spanish government. It has grown through a long series of mergers and acquisitions. Although primarily focused on extraction of minerals, Rio Tinto also has significant operations in refining, particularly the refining of bauxite and iron ore. Rio Tinto has joint head offices in London (global and "plc") and Melbourne ("Limited"  Australia).

Rio Tinto is a dual-listed company traded on both the London Stock Exchange, where it is a component of the FTSE 100 Index, and the Australian Securities Exchange, where it is a component of the S&P/ASX 200 index. Additionally, American depositary shares of Rio Tinto's British branch are traded on the New York Stock Exchange, giving it listings on a total of three major stock exchanges. In the 2020 Forbes Global 2000, Rio Tinto was ranked as the 114th-largest public company in the world.

In May 2020, to expand the Brockman 4 mine, Rio Tinto demolished a sacred cave in Juukan Gorge, Western Australia, which had evidence of 46,000 years of continual human occupation, and was considered the only inland site in Australia to show signs of continual human occupation through the last Ice Age. Rio Tinto later apologised for the distress caused and CEO Jean-Sébastien Jacques subsequently stepped down.

Rio Tinto has been widely criticised by environmental groups as well as the government of Norway for the environmental impacts of its mining activities: claims of severe environmental damages related to Rio Tinto's engagement in the Grasberg mine in Indonesia led the Government Pension Fund of Norway to exclude Rio Tinto from its investment portfolio.

Academic observers have also expressed concern regarding Rio Tinto's operations in Papua New Guinea, which they allege were one catalyst of the Bougainville separatist crisis. There have also been concerns over corruption: in July 2017 the UK's Serious Fraud Office (SFO) announced the launch of a fraud and corruption investigation into the company's business practices in Guinea.

Formation

Since antiquity, a site along the Rio Tinto in Huelva, Spain, has been mined for copper, silver, gold and other minerals. Around 3000 BC, Iberians and Tartessians began mining the site, followed by the Phoenicians, Greeks, Romans, Visigoths and Moors. After a period of abandonment, the mines were rediscovered in 1556 and the Spanish government began operating them once again in 1724.

However, Spain's mining operations there were inefficient, and the government itself was otherwise distracted by political and financial crises, leading the government to sell the mines in 1873 at a price later determined to be well below actual value. The purchasers of the mine were led by Hugh Matheson's Matheson and Company, which ultimately formed a syndicate consisting of Deutsche Bank (56% ownership), Matheson (24%) and the civil engineering firm Clark, Punchard and Company (20%). At an auction held by the Spanish government to sell the mine on 14 February 1873, the group won with a bid of £3.68 million (ESP 92.8 million). The bid also specified that Spain would permanently relinquish any right to claim royalties on the mine's production. Following purchase of the mine, the syndicate launched the Rio Tinto Company, registering it on 29 March 1873. At the end of the 1880s, control of the firm passed to the Rothschild family, who increased the scale of its mining operations.

Operating history

Following their purchase of the Rio Tinto Mine, the new ownership constructed a number of new processing facilities, innovated new mining techniques, and expanded mining activities.

From 1877 to 1891, the Rio Tinto Mine was the world's leading producer of copper.
 From 1870 through 1925, the company was inwardly focused on fully exploiting the Rio Tinto Mine, with little attention paid to expansion or exploration activities outside of Spain. The company enjoyed strong financial success until 1914, colluding with other pyrite producers to control market prices. However, World War I and its aftermath effectively eliminated the United States as a viable market for European pyrites, leading to a decline in the firm's prominence.

The company's failure to diversify during this period led to the slow decline of the company among the ranks of international mining firms. However, this changed in 1925, when Sir Auckland Geddes succeeded Lord Alfred Milner as chairman. Geddes and the new management team he installed focused on diversification of the company's investment strategy and the introduction of organisational and marketing reforms. Geddes led the company into a series of joint ventures with customers in the development of new technologies, as well as exploration and development of new mines outside of Spain. Between 1925 and 1931, Geddes recruited two directors: JN Buchanan (finance director) and RM Preston (commercial director), as well as other executives involved with technical and other matters.

Perhaps most significant was the company's investment in copper mines in Northern Rhodesia, later Zambia, which it eventually consolidated into the Rhokana Corporation. These and later efforts at diversification eventually allowed the company to divest from the Rio Tinto mine in Spain. By the 1950s, Franco's nationalistic government had made it increasingly difficult to exploit Spanish resources for the profit of foreigners. Rio Tinto Company, supported by its international investments, was able to divest two-thirds of its Spanish operations in 1954 and the remainder over the following years.

Major mergers and acquisitions
Like many major mining companies, Rio Tinto has historically grown through a series of mergers and acquisitions.

Early acquisitions

The company's first major acquisition occurred in 1929, when the company issued stock for the purpose of raising 2.5 million pounds to invest in Northern Rhodesian copper mining companies, which was fully invested by the end of 1930. The Rio Tinto company consolidated its holdings of these various firms under the Rhokana Corporation by forcing the various companies to merge.

Rio Tinto's investment in Rhodesian copper mines did much to support the company through troubled times at its Spanish Rio Tinto operations spanning the Spanish Civil War, World War II and Franco's nationalistic policies. In the 1950s, the political situation made it increasingly difficult for mostly British and French owners to extract profits from Spanish operations, and the company decided to dispose of the mines from which it took its name. Thus, in 1954, Rio Tinto Company sold two-thirds of its stake in the Rio Tinto mines, disposing of the rest over the following years. The sale of the mines financed extensive exploration activities over the following decade.

Merger with Consolidated Zinc
The company's exploration activities presented the company with an abundance of opportunities, but it lacked sufficient capital and operating revenue to exploit those opportunities. This situation precipitated the next, and perhaps most significant, merger in the company's history. In 1962, Rio Tinto Company merged with the Australian firm Consolidated Zinc to form the Rio Tinto – Zinc Corporation (RTZ) and its main subsidiary, Conzinc Riotinto of Australia (CRA). The merger provided Rio Tinto the ability to exploit its new-found opportunities, and gave Consolidated Zinc a much larger asset base.

RTZ and CRA were separately managed and operated, with CRA focusing on opportunities within Australasia and RTZ taking the rest of the world. However, the companies continued to trade separately, and RTZ's ownership of CRA dipped below 50% by 1986. The two companies' strategic needs eventually led to conflicts of interest regarding new mining opportunities, and shareholders of both companies determined a merger was in their mutual best interest. In 1995, the companies merged into a dual listed company, in which management was consolidated into a single entity and shareholder interests were aligned and equivalent, although maintained as shares in separately named entities. The merger also precipitated a name change; after two years as RTZ-CRA, RTZ became Rio Tinto plc and CRA became Rio Tinto Limited, referred to collectively as Rio Tinto Group or simply Rio Tinto.

Recent mergers, acquisitions and events
Major acquisitions following the Consolidated Zinc merger included U.S. Borax, a major producer of borax, bought in 1968, Kennecott Utah Copper and BP Australia's coal assets which were bought from BP in 1989, and a 70.7% interest in the New South Wales operations of Coal & Allied, also in 1989. In 1993, the company acquired Nerco and the United States coal mining businesses of Cordero Mining Company.

In 2000, Rio Tinto acquired North Limited, an Australian company with iron ore and uranium mines, for $2.8 billion. The takeover was partially motivated as a response to North Limited's 1999 bid to have Rio Tinto's Pilbara railway network declared open access. The Australian Competition & Consumer Commission regulatory body approved the acquisition in August 2000, and the purchase was completed in October of the same year. That year, Rio Tinto also bought North Limited and Ashton Mining for US$4 billion, adding additional resources in aluminium, iron ore, diamonds and coal. In 2001, it bought (under Coal and Allied Industries) the Australian coal businesses of the Peabody Energy Corporation.

On 14 November 2007, Rio Tinto completed its largest acquisition to date, purchasing Canadian aluminium company Alcan for $38.1 billion, "the largest mining deal ever completed". Alcan's chief executive, Jacynthe Côté, led the new division, renamed Rio Tinto Alcan with its headquarters situated in Montreal.

Activity in 2008 and 2009 was focused on divestments of assets to raise cash and refocus on core business opportunities. The company sold three major assets in 2008, raising about $3 billion in cash. In the first quarter of 2009, Rio Tinto reached agreements to sell its interests in the Corumbá iron ore mine and the Jacobs Ranch coal mine, and completed sales of an aluminium smelter in China and the company's potash operations, for an additional estimated $2.5 billion.

On 5 July 2009, four Rio Tinto employees were arrested in Shanghai for corruption and espionage. One of the arrested, Australian citizen Stern Hu, was "suspected of stealing Chinese state secrets for foreign countries and was detained on criminal charges", according to a spokesman for the Chinese foreign ministry. Stern Hu was also accused of bribery by Chinese steel mill executives for sensitive information during the iron ore contract negotiations.

On 19 March 2010 Rio Tinto and its biggest shareholder, Aluminum Corporation of China Limited (Chinalco), signed a memorandum of understanding to develop Rio Tinto's iron ore project in the Simandou mine in Simandou, Guinea. On 29 July 2010, Rio Tinto and Chinalco signed a binding agreement to establish this joint venture covering the development and operation of the Simandou mine.

Under the terms of the agreement, the joint venture maintains Rio Tinto's 95% interest in the Simandou project as follows: By providing US$1.35 billion on an earn-in basis through sole funding of ongoing development over a 2-3 year period, Chalco, a subsidiary of Chinalco, would acquire a 47% interest in the joint venture. Once the full sum was paid, Rio Tinto would be left with a 50.35% interest in the project and Chalco would have 44.65%. The remaining 5% would be owned by the International Finance Corporation (IFC), the financing arm of the World Bank. On 22 April 2011 Rio Tinto, its subsidiary Simfer S.A. (Simfer), and the Guinean Government signed a settlement agreement that secured Rio Tinto's mining rights in Guinea to the southern concession of Simandou, known as blocks 3 and 4. According to the agreement, Simfer would pay US$700 million and receive mining concession and government approval of the proposed Chalco and Rio Tinto Simandou joint venture.

In April 2011, Rio Tinto gained a majority stake in Riversdale Mining.

In 2011, the company rekindled its interest in potash when it entered a joint venture with Acron Group to develop the Albany potash development, in southern Saskatchewan, Canada. Following an exploration program, Acron in a June 2014 statement described Albany as "one of the best potash development opportunities in the world".

On 13 December 2011, an independent arbitrator cleared the way for Rio Tinto, which had owned 49% of Ivanhoe Mines (now known as Turquoise Hill Resources), to take it over: he said the $16-billion Canadian group's "poison pill" defence was not valid. Ivanhoe had developed Oyu Tolgoi in Mongolia, one of the world's largest-known copper deposits. On 28 January 2012, Rio Tinto gained control of Ivanhoe Mines and removed the management.

In October 2013, Rio Tinto agreed to sell its majority stake in Australia's third-largest coal mine to Glencore and Sumitomo for a little over US$1 billion, as part of the firm's plans to focus on larger operations. Less than a year later, Rio Tinto rejected two merger proposals from Glencore, proffered in July and August 2014; the merger of Glencore and Rio Tinto would have created the world's largest mining company.

In May 2015, Rio Tinto announced plans to sell some of its aluminium assets as part of a possible $1 billion deal, two years after a similar but failed attempt.

In September 2020, it was announced that the company's Chief Executive Jean-Sébastien Jacques, along with two executives, will resign because of Rio Tinto's role in destroying two ancient rock shelters in the Pilbara region of Australia. The company's Chief Financial Officer, Jakob Stausholm became the new Chief Executive on 1 January 2021.

In March 2022, Rio Tinto completed the acquisition of Rincon Mining's lithium project in Argentina for $825 million, following approval by Australia's Foreign Investment Review Board.

Subsidiaries 
The company has operations on six continents, but is mainly concentrated in Australia and Canada, and owns its mining operations through a complex web of wholly and partly owned subsidiaries.

Energy Resources of Australia – 68.4%
Hathor Exploration – 100%
QIT-Fer et Titane – 100%
Dampier Salt – 68.4%
Iron Ore Company of Canada – 58.7%
Pacific Aluminum – 100%
Richards Bay Minerals – 74%

Corporate status
Rio Tinto is primarily organised into four operational businesses, divided by product type:

 Iron ore
 Aluminium – aluminium, bauxite and alumina
 Copper & Diamonds – copper and by-products such as gold, silver, molybdenum and sulphuric acid, and the company's diamond interests
 Energy & Minerals – uranium interests, industrial minerals such as borax, salt and titanium dioxide. The corporation previously held coal production assets.

These operating groups are supported by separate divisions providing exploration and function support.

Stock structure and ownership
Rio Tinto is structured as a dual-listed company, with listings on both the London Stock Exchange (symbol: RIO), under the name "Rio Tinto Plc", and the Australian Securities Exchange (symbol: RIO) in Sydney, under the name "Rio Tinto Limited". The dual-listed company structure grants shareholders of the two companies the same proportional economic interests and ownership rights in the consolidated Rio Tinto, in such a way as to be equivalent to all shareholders of the two companies actually being shareholders in a single, unified entity. This structure was implemented to avoid adverse tax consequences and regulatory burdens. To eliminate currency exchange issues, the company's accounts are kept, and dividends paid, in United States dollars.

Rio Tinto is one of the largest companies listed on either exchange. As such, it is included in the widely quoted indices for each market: the FTSE 100 Index of the London Stock Exchange, and the S&P/ASX 200 index of the Australian Securities Exchange. LSE-listed shares in Rio Tinto plc can also be traded indirectly on the New York Stock Exchange via an American Depositary Receipt. As of 4 March 2009, Rio Tinto was the fourth-largest publicly listed mining company in the world, with a market capitalisation around $134 billion. As of mid-February 2009, shareholders were geographically distributed 42% in the United Kingdom, 18% in North America, 16% in Australia, 14% in Asia and 10% in continental Europe.

BHP Billiton bid
On 8 November 2007, rival mining company BHP Billiton announced it was seeking to purchase Rio Tinto Group in an all-share deal. This offer was rejected by the board of Rio Tinto as "significantly undervalu[ing]" the company. Another attempt by BHP Billiton for a hostile takeover, valuing Rio Tinto at $147 billion, was rejected on the same grounds. Meanwhile, the Chinese government-owned resources group Chinalco and the U.S. aluminium producer Alcoa purchased 12% of Rio Tinto's London-listed shares in a move that would block or severely complicate BHP Billiton's plans to buy the company. BHP Billiton's bid was withdrawn on 25 November 2008, with the BHP citing market instability from the global financial crisis of 2008–2009.

Chinalco investment
On 1 February 2009, Rio Tinto management announced that they were in talks to receive a substantial equity infusion from Chinalco, a major Chinese state-controlled mining enterprise, in exchange for ownership interest in certain assets and bonds. Chinalco was already a major shareholder, having bought up 9% of the company in a surprise move in early 2008; its ownership stake had risen to 9.8% by 2014, making it Rio Tinto's biggest investor. The proposed investment structure reportedly involves $12.3 billion for the purchase of ownership interests of Rio Tinto assets in its iron ore, copper and aluminium operations, plus $7.2 billion for convertible bonds. The transaction would bring Chinalco's ownership of the company to roughly 18.5%. The deal is still pending approval from regulators in the United States and China, and has not yet been approved by shareholders, although regulatory approval has been received from Germany and the Australian Competition & Consumer Commission. The largest barrier to completing the investment may come from Rio Tinto's shareholders; support for the deal by shareholders was never overwhelming and has reportedly declined in 2009, as other financing options (such as a more traditional bond issuance) are beginning to appear more realistic as a viable alternative funding source. A shareholder vote on the proposed deal was expected in the third quarter of 2009.

Rio Tinto is believed to have pursued this combined asset and convertible bond sale to raise cash to satisfy its debt obligations, which required payments of $9.0 billion in October 2009 and $10.5 billion by the end of 2010. The company has also noted China's increasing appetite for commodities, and the potential for increased opportunities to exploit these market trends, as a key factor in recommending the transaction to its shareholders.

In March 2010, it was announced that Chinalco would invest $1.3 billion for a 44.65% stake in Rio Tinto's iron ore project in Simandou, Guinea. Rio Tinto retained 50.35% ownership at Simandou.

In November 2011, Rio joined with Chinalco to explore for copper resources in China's complex landscape, by setting up a new company, CRTX, 51% owned by Chinalco and 49% by Rio Tinto.

Management

Under the company's dual-listed company structure, management powers of the Rio Tinto are consolidated in a single senior management group led by a board of directors and executive committee. The board of directors has both executive and non-executive members, while the executive committee is composed of the heads of major operational groups.
 Board of Directors
Executive Directors
Dominic Barton, chairman
 Jakob Stausholm, chief executive
 Non-Executive Directors
 Megan Clark AC
 Hinda Gharbi
Simon McKeon AO
 Simon Henry
 Jennifer Nason
 Sam Laidlaw
Ngaire Woods CBE
Rio Tinto engages professional lobbyists to represent its interests in various jurisdictions. In South Australia, the company in represented by DPG Advisory Solutions.

Operations
Rio Tinto's main business is the production of raw materials including copper, iron ore, bauxite, diamonds, uranium and industrial minerals including titanium dioxide, salt, gypsum and borates. Rio Tinto also performs processing on some of these materials, with plants dedicated to processing bauxite into alumina and aluminium, and smelting iron ore into iron. The company also produces other metals and minerals as by-products from the processing of its main resources, including gold, silver, molybdenum, sulphuric acid, nickel, potash, lead and zinc. Rio Tinto controls gross assets of $81 billion in value across the globe, with main concentrations in Australia (35%), Canada (34%), Europe (13%) and the United States (11%), and smaller holdings in South America (3%), Africa (3%) and Indonesia (1%).

Iron ore: Rio Tinto Iron Ore

The Australian operations of Rio Tinto Iron Ore (RTIO) comprises an integrated iron ore operations in the Pilbara, Western Australia. The Pilbara iron ore operations include 16 iron ore mines, four independent port terminals, a 1,700-kilometre rail network and related infrastructure. The corporation also has had a majority stake in Iron Ore Company of Canada since its 2000 hostile takeover of North Ltd.

Copper and by-products: Rio Tinto Copper

Copper was one of Rio Tinto's main products from its earliest days operating at the Rio Tinto complex of mines in Spain. Since that time, the company has divested itself from its original Spanish mines, and grown its copper-mining capacity through acquisitions of major copper resources around the world. The copper group's main active mining interests are Oyu Tolgoi mine in Mongolia, Kennecott Utah Copper in the United States, and Minera Escondida in Chile. Most of these mines are joint ventures with other major mining companies, with Rio Tinto's ownership ranging from 30% to 80%; only Kennecott is wholly owned. Operations typically include mining of ore through to production of 99.99% purified copper, including extraction of economically valuable by-products. Together, Rio Tinto's share of copper production at its mines totalled nearly 700,000 tonnes, making the company the fourth-largest copper producer in the world.

Rio Tinto Copper continues to seek new opportunities for expansion, with major exploration activities at the Resolution Copper project in the United States, Winu in Australia, and Oyu Tolgoi underground mine in Mongolia. In addition, the company is seeking to become a major producer of nickel, with exploration projects currently underway in the United States and Indonesia.

Although not the primary focus of Rio Tinto Copper's operations, several economically valuable by-products are produced during the refining of copper ore into purified copper. Gold, silver, molybdenum and sulphuric acid are all removed from copper ore during processing. Due to the scale of Rio Tinto's copper mining and processing facilities, the company is also a leading producer of these materials, which drive substantial revenues to the company.

Sales of copper generated 8% of the company's 2008 revenues, and copper and by-product operations accounted for 16% of underlying earnings.
Rio Tinto exclusively provided the metal to produce the 4,700 gold, silver and bronze medals at the London 2012 Olympic and Paralympic Games. This was the second time Rio Tinto had done so for Olympic medals, having previously provided the metals for the Salt Lake City 2002 Winter Olympics. Together, Rio Tinto's share of copper production at its mines totalled nearly 700,000 tonnes, making the company the fourth-largest copper producer in the world.
Rio Tinto also owns the naming rights to Rio Tinto Stadium located in nearby Sandy, Utah, and the home of the Major League Soccer team, Real Salt Lake.

Aluminium

Rio Tinto consolidated its aluminium-related businesses into its aluminium product group (originally named Rio Tinto Alcan), formed in late 2007, when Rio Tinto purchased the Canadian company Alcan for $38.1 billion. Combined with Rio Tinto's existing aluminium-related assets, the new aluminium division vaulted to the world number-one producer of bauxite, alumina and aluminium. Aluminium division kept key leadership from Alcan, and the company's headquarters remain in Montreal.

Rio Tinto divides its Aluminium operations into three main areas—bauxite, alumina and primary metal. The Bauxite and Alumina unit mines raw bauxite from locations in Australia, Brazil and Africa. The unit then refines the bauxite into alumina at refineries located in Australia, Brazil, Canada and France. The Primary Metal business unit's operations consist of smelting aluminium from alumina, with smelters located in 11 countries around the world. The Primary Metal group also operates several power plants to support the energy-intensive smelting process.

The aluminium division has interests in seven bauxite mines and deposits, six alumina refineries and six speciality alumina plants, 26 aluminium smelters, 13 power plants and 120 facilities for the manufacture of speciality products. The acquisition of Alcan operations in 2007 substantially increased Rio Tinto's asset base, revenues and profits: in 2008, 41% of company revenues and 10% of underlying earnings were attributable to the aluminium division.

Uranium: Rio Tinto Energy

Rio Tinto Energy is a business group of Rio Tinto dedicated to the mining and sale of uranium. Rio Tinto's uranium operations are located at two mines: the Ranger Uranium Mine of Energy Resources of Australia and the Rössing Uranium Mine in Namibia. The company is the third-largest producer of uranium in the world. According to Rio Tinto's website, the company institutes strict controls and contractual limitations on uranium exports, limiting uses to peaceful, nonexplosive uses only. Such controls are intended to limit use of the company's uranium production to use as fuel for nuclear power plants only, and not for use in the production of nuclear weapons. Rio Tinto Energy was responsible for 12% of revenues and 18% of underlying earnings in 2008.

Diamonds: Rio Tinto Diamonds

Rio Tinto Diamonds operates three diamond mines: the Argyle Diamond Mine in Western Australia (100% ownership), the Diavik Diamond Mine in the Northwest Territories of Canada (60% ownership), and the Murowa Diamond Mine located in Zimbabwe (78% ownership). Together, these three mines produce 20% of the world's annual production of rough diamonds, making Rio Tinto the world's third-largest producer of mined diamonds.

The diamond business unit's most advanced exploration project is the Falcon Project in Saskatchewan, Canada, where Rio Tinto owns 60% of the project in a joint venture with Star Diamond Corp. Rio Tinto Diamonds generated 1% of revenues and earnings for Rio Tinto in 2008.

Industrial minerals: Rio Tinto Minerals
 
Rio Tinto Minerals is a diverse business group with mining and processing interest in borates, salt and gypsum. Rio Tinto Borax, with operations in California, supplies nearly one-third of the world's annual demand for refined borates. The Minerals group is also majority owner of Dampier Salt, which produces over 9 million tonnes of salt and 1.5 million tonnes of gypsum annually from its three facilities in north-west Australia. Rio Tinto Minerals accounted for 6% of company revenues, and contributed 3% to earnings in 2008.

On 31 January 2010, the management of U.S. Borax locked out its hourly workforce, replacing the workers with nonunion workers and managers from other Rio Tinto operations. The 560 International Longshore and Warehouse Union Local 30 members immediately began a fireside vigil that garnered national and international labour attention. ILWU filed several unfair labour practices against the company, including an illegal lock-out claim.

Iron products and titanium: Rio Tinto Iron and Titanium
Titanium dioxide is mined at three locations in Canada, South Africa and Madagascar, and refined at QIT-Fer et Titane's Canadian facilities.

A media report in October 2013 revealed that the corporation plans to establish a fully automated railroad system for the transportation of iron ore across the Australian outback by 2015, thereby replacing the corporation's train drivers. The United Kingdom-based transport historian Christian Wolmar stated at the same time that the train drivers are most likely the highest-paid members of the occupation in the world at that time. As part of an overall strategy to increase profit margins, the corporation is spending US$518 million on the project.

Development of autonomous technologies 

Rio Tinto is a global leader in the development of autonomous technologies for use in the mining sector. As of 2018, Rio Tinto's fleet of 80 autonomous Komatsu vehicles had moved over 1 billion tonnes of ore and waste material in Western Australia's Pilbara region.

Furthermore, in late 2017 Rio Tinto announced funding for their Koodaideri Mine in Western Australia, which Rio Tinto had dubbed their "intelligent mine."

Financial results
Rio Tinto's revenues and earnings have grown substantially in 2003–2010, with one of the largest increases attributable to the company's acquisition of Alcan in 2007. Although operating margin is significantly impacted by the market prices of the various commodities it produces, Rio Tinto has remained profitable over its recent history and consistently generated positive cash flows from operations.

Controversies

Poor working conditions 
The United Steelworkers of America has claimed that mine workers at Kennecott Copper Mine worked for eight months without stopping during a labour dispute about how these workers were treated. This dispute ended with a settlement including a six-year labour agreement, only for Rio Tinto to lay off over 120 workers just two days later. Tom Johnson, a spokesperson from United Steelworkers of America said, “Rio Tinto does not make an effort to use technologies that are more sustainable. They do not discuss with local communities their environmental impact. They operate in secret with governments and with groups that are friendly to them.”

London Olympic Games 
The metals for the medals for the 2012 London Olympic games were supplied from the Bingham canyon Mine located in Utah and the Oyu Tolgoi Mine in Mongolia, which caused uproar among many activist groups, especially in Utah due to their concern about the impact to the local cities. One person particularly bothered by this decision was the Commissioner of the London Games, Meredith Alexander, who quit her position and led a coalition of human rights and environmental groups during the “Greenwashed Gold Campaign”.

Panguna Mine, Papua New Guinea 
In 2000, Rio Tinto faced a federal lawsuit on behalf of Papua New Guinea due to the harm the company's mining operations at the Panguna Mine had to the environment for decades. Local communities filed this suit claiming that the local Kawerong-Jaba river delta was used as a dumping site for “more than one billion tons of mine waste”. According to the lawsuit, the citizens are claiming that the mining giant used harmful chemicals and bulldozers to destroy the environment and specifically the rainforest and used their waterways as a dumping site for the chemicals and runoff caused by their mining operations. These citizens believe that Rio Tinto was targeting them due to their race and culture and was even paying what they referred to as “slave wages” to the company's black workers.

Rio Tinto massacre 
Durings the first years of the company's operation in Spain, the company practiced open-air pyrite calcination in blast furnaces. The toxic fumes released by this process had a negative impact on the farmland and the local agriculturists, the company's workers and some local anarchists came together to protest against this practice. On February 4, 1888, several thousand rank and file—agriculturalists, anarchists, and mineworkers—marched to the Rio Tinto town hall (ayuntamiento) to deliver their petitions to the mayor. While the mayor spoke with the crowd's representatives, the Huelva military governor and civil guards watched over the protest. The military governor's attempts to disperse the crowd only incensed it further. The civil guards, under perceived threat of mob violence, fired on the crowd, killing at least 13 and injuring 35.

Involvement with Axis powers in World War II
Rio Tinto's status as a mainly British-owned company, located in Spain and producing pyrites—an important material for military applications—created a complicated set of circumstances for the company's operation in the 1930s and 1940s. During the Spanish Civil War, the region in which Rio Tinto's mines were located came under the control of General Franco's Nationalists in 1936. However, Franco increasingly intervened in the company's operations, at times requisitioning pyrite supplies for use by Spain and its Axis allies Germany and Italy, forcing price controls on the company's production, restricting exports, and threatening nationalisation of the mines. Although company management (and indirectly, the British government) managed to counteract some of these efforts by Franco, much of the mine's pyrite production was channelled to Axis powers before and during World War II. Nonetheless, Franco's meddling caused the mine's production and profitability to fall precipitously during and after the war, leading the company to ultimately exit from its Spanish operations in 1954.

Guinean Iron Ore
In 2015, Rio Tinto was criticised by the Guinean government for the many mining delays at the local Simandou mine. Cece Noramou, government official said the government was "running out of patience". President Alpha Conde himself said that "there have been people at Simandou for 15 years, 20 years, and they've never produced a ton of iron". Even before 2015, the Guinean government had expressed their displeasure and dissatisfaction with Rio Tinto; in 2008, the Guinean government annulled half of the company's Simandou rights and gave them to BSGR, a French–Israeli-owned mining company.

In late 2016, Rio Tinto agreed to sell its stake in the Simandou iron ore mine to Chinalco and exit the deal. The deal was negotiated after the company's case against Vale and BSGR was dismissed at US District Court.

Racism, bullying, and sexual harassment 
In 2022, Rio Tinto released a report that described a work culture of bullying, harassment and racism at the global mining giant, including twenty one complaints by women of actual or attempted rape or sexual assault in the past five years. Elizabeth Broderick, who surveyed more than 10,000 of Rio Tinto's 45,000 employees, released an independent report, which found that systemic bullying, sexism and racism were common. According to the report, these harmful behaviours were often tolerated or normalised. "Harmful behaviour by serial perpetrators is often an open secret," Elizabeth Broderick said. On the whole, about 28% of women and 7% of men had experienced sexual harassment at Rio. But this rate rose to 41% for female workers at FIFO sites. Most women who responded had experienced “everyday sexism”. Near half of the workforce reported being bullied, and described the resultant loss of confidence, declining performance, anxiety and depression. According to Broderick, LGBTIQ+ employees had experienced "elevated rates of bullying, sexual harassment and racism”. A "culture of silence" had kept workers from reporting unacceptable behaviour. People who worked in a country they weren't born in had experienced high rates of racism, while almost 40% of men who identify as Aboriginal or Torres Strait Islander had endured racism in Australia.

The Australian Human Rights Commission found that, from 2015 and 2020, approximately three in four women had experienced at least some form of sexual harassment while in the mining industry, in part due to a gender imbalance.

Juukan Gorge destruction

In May 2020, to expand the Brockman 4 mine, Rio Tinto demolished an Australian Aboriginal sacred site in Juukan Gorge, Western Australia, which had evidence of 46,000 years of continual human occupation, and was considered the only inland prehistoric site in Australia to show signs of continual human occupation through the last Ice Age. The company later revealed it had three alternative options to preserve the site, but chose to destroy it without informing the traditional owners of the alternatives. Permission to destroy the site had been given in 2013 under the state Aboriginal Heritage Act 1972, which, however, has been under review since 2018. The Puutu Kunti Kurrama and Pinikura peoples, who are the local land custodians, had fought the decision. The destruction brought widespread criticism.

On 31 May, Rio Tinto apologised for the distress caused. According to 35 Aboriginal and Torres Strait Islander and human rights organisations, Rio Tinto's qualified apology is "far from an adequate response to an incident of this magnitude".

On 9 June, Reconciliation Australia revoked its endorsement of Rio Tinto as partner in reconciliation action plans, defining the behaviour of the corporation a breathtaking breach of a respectful relationship" which was "devastating for the Traditional Owners and robbed the world of a uniquely valuable cultural heritage site". Also on 9 July, The Corporate Human Rights Benchmark (CHRB) and the World Benchmarking Alliance (WBA) condemned "the destruction of invaluable cultural heritage at Juukan Gorge", adding that this "incident is a severe adverse impact on cultural rights that has engendered extreme concern and outrage among the Puutu Kunti Kurrama and Pinikura traditional owners of the site as well as Aboriginal and Torres Strait Islander communities and their allies". The CHRB and WBA also called "on Rio Tinto to take appropriate action to carry out an independent investigation of the incident, involving affected stakeholders, to provide effective remedy and to prevent similar impacts in the future, in Australia and elsewhere". The statement was attached to the company's listing in the 2019 Benchmark Report.

On 4 August, in its submission to a parliamentary inquiry looking at the destruction of the sacred rock caves, the company said it "missed opportunities" to alter its mine plan. A dig in 2014 and a final report on the archaeological excavations in 2018 underlined the cultural and historical significance of the caves. Rio Tinto said it did not "clearly communicate" its plan for destroying the sacred site to the native land owners. Although no executives were fired, on 24 August the company announced that three senior executives would lose a combined £3.8 million ($5 million) from their expected bonus payments.

On 11 September 2020, it was announced that, as a result of the destruction at Juukan Gorge, CEO Jean-Sébastien Jacques and two other Rio Tinto executives would step down. The National Native Title Council (NNTC) welcomed the move, but said that there should be an independent review into the company's procedures and culture to ensure that such an incident could never happen again. Rio Tinto admitted their error, issued an apology via media and on their website, and also committed to building relationships with the traditional owners as well as getting Indigenous people into leadership roles in the company. One analysis of what went wrong in Rio Tinto to allow the destruction to occur suggested that processes failed at several levels, but mainly due to its "segmented organisational structure", a poor reporting structure, and Indigenous relations not being properly represented at a high enough level.

2021 Serbian protests 
During 2021, a series of mass protests broke out in Serbia against the construction of a lithium mine in Western Serbia by the Rio Tinto corporation. Protesters blocked major roads and bridges in Belgrade and other major cities. In the town of Šabac, there was an incident when a member of the ruling party attacked the protesters with an excavator, and then the protesters were beaten by an armed group of hooligans. The Jadar lithium project is driven by a "significant" supply gap for lithium, as demand for the metal used in electric vehicles (EV) and green technologies continues to soar, particularly in North America and Europe. The project would make Serbia the biggest producer of lithium globally, and provide raw materials to more than 1 million electric cars.

As of 11 December 2021, protests are still ongoing with demands to stop and permanently prohibit any mining-related activity in Jadar region. An activist from Ekološki Ustanak (Environmental Uprising), one of the prominent organisers of the protests, told to the local media that "protests will be continued until the basic demand is met, which is the expulsion of Rio Tinto from Serbia and the adoption of a law banning lithium exploitation in Serbia".

In December 2021, Rio Tinto said it was considering the concerns of residents in western Serbia after Loznica's municipal assembly scrapped a plan to allocate land for a lithium project.

Misplaced radioactive capsule 

In January 2023, the company announced that it had misplaced a capsule of radioactive material that was being transported from their Gudai-Darri mine in Western Australia. The capsule is a 8 by 6 mm cylinder containing a 19-gigabecquerel caesium 137 ceramic source. It has the capability of causing serious illness if it is not handled correctly. According to the company, the capsule was lost somewhere between Newman and Perth, a distance of 1,400km. The company has already begun an investigation into the disappearance and are working alongside authorities. 

Later the same month the capsule was recovered by investigators and verified by the Australian Defense Forces.

Environment

Mining 
Rio Tinto has been widely criticised by environmental groups and at least one national government for the environmental impacts of its mining activities. The most high-level environmental criticism to date has come from the government of Norway, which divested itself from Rio Tinto shares and banned further investment due to environmental concerns. Claims of severe environmental damages related to Rio Tinto's engagement in the Grasberg mine in Indonesia led the Government Pension Fund of Norway to exclude Rio Tinto from its investment portfolio.

Rio Tinto disputes the claims of environmental damage at the Grasberg mine, and states that the company has long maintained an excellent record on environmental issues.

After the former Panguna copper and gold mine in Bougainville, Papua New Guinea, which was abandoned by Rio Tinto in 1989, caused flooding, pollution of water wells and river poisoning, residents of the region filed a request for investigation with the Australian government in September 2020.

As part of a rider of the National Defense Authorization Act, the United States agreed in 2014 to hand over Oak Flat in Arizona to a joint venture of Rio Tinto and BHP Billiton to build the Resolution Copper mine. The project would also deplete and contaminate Arizona's already limited groundwater supply. U.S. Representative Raúl Grijalva has introduced on four occasions a proposal for the land transfer to be halted, most recently in March 2021 after the Joe Biden administration paused the land transfer.

Carbon dioxide emissions 
According to The Guardian, Rio Tinto is one of the top 100 industrial greenhouse gas producers in the world, accounting for 0.75 percent of global industrial greenhouse gas emissions between 1988 and 2015. In 2016, Rio Tinto estimated to have produced 32 million tonnes of carbon dioxide equivalent in its own climate change report.

In March 2018, Rio Tinto was urged by institutional investors to set new rules requiring the company to adhere to the goals of the Paris Agreement to limit global warming to 1.5 Celsius, including detailed plans to reduce scope 1 to 3 emissions. Rio Tinto's top executives rejected the resolution, arguing that the company had made a lot of progress in reducing its greenhouse gas emissions and that appropriate plans were in place to deal with climate change.

Rio also argued that scope 3 emissions, those of its customers, were beyond the firm's control. Nevertheless, the corporation in September 2019 signed a partnership with Chinese steelmaker China Baowu Steel Group to find ways to reduce greenhouse gas emissions from steel making, in an attempt to tackle the scope 3 issue.

In 2021, Rio unveiled plans to spend $7.5 billion in direct capital expenditure on efforts to decarbonise, announcing new targets of cutting Scope 1 and 2 emissions (from their 2018 baseline) by 15% before 2025 and by 50% by 2030 and scope 3 emissions by 30% before 2030. This is to be achieved through 5 GW of wind and solar projects for the Boyne Island and Tomago smelters and 1 GW for Pilbara mining, full electrification of the Pilbara system including all trucks, mobile equipment and rail operations, replacing gas, and investments into green steel and aluminium, joining fellow iron ore giants Fortescue Metals and BHP in the effort to transition to renewable powered operations.

Rio Tinto reported Total CO2e emissions (Direct + Indirect) for the twelve months ending 31 December 2020 at 31,500 Kt (+100/+0.3% y-o-y).

Labour and human rights
Academic observers have also expressed concern regarding Rio Tinto's operations in Papua New Guinea, which they allege were one catalyst of the Bougainville separatist crisis. The British antipoverty charity War on Want has also criticised Rio Tinto for its complicity in the serious human rights violations which have occurred near the mines it operates in Indonesia and Papua New Guinea.

On 31 January 2010, Rio Tinto locked out nearly 600 workers from a mine in Boron, California, USA.

Rio Tinto was also accused of planning and funding the murder of RTI activist Shehla Masood in Bhopal, India. Apparently, she was protesting illegal diamond mining done by Rio Tinto in connivance with government officers. The case was, however, solved and no connection to Rio Tinto was established, though popular opinion still perceives them as the possible culprit.

Rio Tinto is not, however, universally condemned for its ethical behaviour. The company has won an award for ethical behaviour, the Worldaware Award for Sustainable Development in 1993. The award, although given by an independent committee, is sponsored by another multinational corporation (in this case, the sponsor was Tate and Lyle). Rio Tinto has, in turn, sponsored its own WorldAware award, the Rio Tinto Award for Long-term Commitment. The British charity Worldaware ceased to exist in March 2005. These awards, awarded to extractive industries which make some environmental commitments to deflect the more general criticisms of their operations, are referred to by corporate watchdog groups as "greenwashing".

Corruption allegations

In China 

In 2009, Chinese authorities began investigating allegations against Rio Tinto. These included bribing executives from 16 of China's biggest steel mill companies to get hold of secret information. On 29 March 2010 four Rio Tinto employees including Australian citizen Stern Hu were found guilty of these charges and of accepting millions of dollars in bribes. They were ordered to pay hundreds of thousands of dollars in fines, and sentenced to 7 to 14 years in jail.

In Guinea 
Rio Tinto has been embroiled in a number of corruption allegations over its acquisition of stakes in the Simandou iron ore mine in Guinea.

Rio Tinto launched an internal probe into the matter run by an independent law firm, and on 9 November 2016 announced it would report the findings to the U.S. Securities and Exchange Commission (SEC), the Serious Fraud Office (United Kingdom), the Australian Securities & Investments Commission, and the U.S. Justice Department. Rio Tinto also declared they would cooperate with all related investigations and fired two top executives in connection with the matter, one of whom was head of energy and minerals, Alan Davies, who led the Simandou operation in 2011. He was suspended after the investigators discovered suspicious emails discussing contractual payments from that year. Davies claimed that there were no grounds for the termination of his employment.

The President of Guinea Alpha Condé denied having any knowledge of the illegal transactions, but recordings obtained by France24 prove otherwise.

Sam Walsh, the retiring CEO of the company, had 80% of his pay withheld while the investigation continue.

Also in early November 2016, Former mining minister of Guinea, Mahmoud Thiam, revealed that the head of Rio Tinto's operation in Guinea offered him a bribe in 2010 to win back control of the Simandou mine, and that his offer was supported by senior members of the company.

Rio Tinto is currently facing at least four class action suits in the U.S. demanding damages over the corruption allegations in Guinea. The suit states that Rio Tinto made "materially false and misleading statements" that "deceived" investors.

In July 2017 the Serious Fraud Office (SFO) announced the launch of a fraud and corruption investigation into the company's business practices in Guinea. Following the news of the investigation Rio Tinto shares in the U.S. dropped by 1.4%. The Australian Federal Police is also investigating the allegations. Rio Tinto has announced it would cooperate fully. After the SFO investigation announcement, and amid a search for a new CEO, Rio Director John Varley was forced to resign from his role in the company.

On 6 March 2023, the U.S. SEC announced charges against Rio Tinto plc for violations of the Foreign Corrupt Practices Act (FCPA) arising out of a bribery scheme involving a consultant in Guinea. The company has agreed to pay a $15 million civil penalty to settle the SEC’s charges.

SEC Investigation 
The U.S. Securities and Exchange Commission is investigating a $3 billion impairment charge against Rio Tinto regarding a coal deal they made in Mozambique. Rio acquired Riversdale Mining Ltd., an Australian coal mining company with significant interests in Mozambique, in 2011 for $2.9 billion in an all-cash deal. Two years later they wrote down the value of the assets by $3 billion. Following the impairment charge, which included an additional $11 billion in asset write-downs, chief executive officer of Rio Tinto, Tom Albanese stepped down from his post and left the company. Rio later sold the assets for $50 million.

See also

 Riotinto Railway
 Tourist Mining Train

References

Further reading

 Harvey, Charles E. The Rio Tinto Company: an economic history of a leading international mining concern, 1873-1954. (Alison Hodge, 1981).

External links

 
 
 Rio Tinto Coal Australia (RTCA) corporate website
 
 MBendi Rio Tinto information page, including a detailed list of related companies and Rio Tinto activity worldwide
 Unsustainable: The Ugly Truth about Rio Tinto

 
Companies listed on the Australian Securities Exchange
Companies listed on the New York Stock Exchange
British companies established in 1873
Multinational companies
Diamond mining companies
Mining companies of Australia
Mining companies of the United Kingdom
Dual-listed companies
Companies based in Melbourne
Companies listed on the London Stock Exchange
1873 establishments in Spain
N M Rothschild & Sons
Iron ore mining in Western Australia